United Nations Security Council Resolution 1574, adopted unanimously at a meeting in Nairobi, Kenya, on 19 November 2004, after recalling resolutions 1547 (2004), 1556 (2004) and 1564 (2004), the council welcomed political efforts to resolve the conflicts in Sudan and reiterated its readiness to establish a mission to support the implementation of a Comprehensive Peace Agreement.

The resolution was adopted at the security council's first meeting in 14 years to be held outside its New York City headquarters; it was the fourth meeting held outside headquarters since 1952.

Resolution

Observations
In the preamble of the resolution, the security council recalled that on 5 June 2004, the parties to the Sudan conflict signed a declaration agreeing to six protocols signed between the Sudanese government and Sudan People's Liberation Army/Movement (SPLA/M). The parties were urged to conclude a peace agreement as soon as possible.

Meanwhile, the council was concerned about the growing insecurity and violence in Darfur, violations of human rights and of the ceasefire. The government and rebel groups party to the conflict in the region were called upon to respect human rights, while it was emphasised that the Sudanese government was responsible for protecting its people.

Acts
Both the Sudanese government and the SPLA/M were encouraged to make further efforts towards a conclusive peace agreement, following which a peacekeeping operation would be established to monitor and support its implementation. At the same time, the mandate of the United Nations Advance Mission in Sudan (UNAMIS) was extended for three months until 10 March 2005 and its preparatory work was praised by the council. The delivery of humanitarian aid was called for to the region.

The resolution further demanded that the government, rebel forces and all armed groups immediately end all violence and attacks and facilitate the safety of humanitarian staff in Darfur. It endorsed the decision of the African Union to expand its Darfur mission to 3,320 personnel.

Attached in the annex of the Resolution 1574 was a declaration on the conclusion of negotiations led by the Intergovernmental Authority on Development.

See also
 African Union Mission in Sudan
 African Union – United Nations Hybrid Operation in Darfur
 International response to the War in Darfur
 List of United Nations Security Council Resolutions 1501 to 1600 (2003–2005)
 Southern Sudan
 Timeline of the War in Darfur
 United Nations Mission in Sudan
 War in Darfur

References

External links
 
Text of the Resolution at undocs.org

 1574
2004 in Sudan
 1574
November 2004 events